The Francis Marion National Forest is located north of Charleston, South Carolina. It is named for revolutionary war hero Francis Marion, who was known to the British as the Swamp Fox. It lies entirely within the Middle Atlantic coastal forests ecoregion. The park is also entirely in the Subtropical coniferous forest.

The forest contains the towns of Awendaw, Huger, Jamestown, and McClellanville. Charleston provides emergency services to the southeastern portions of the forest. Forest headquarters are located in Columbia, together with those of Sumter National Forest. There are local ranger district offices located in Cordesville.

In 1989, the forest was nearly destroyed by Hurricane Hugo; only the young growth survived the storm and its aftermath. Today, most trees in the forest do not predate this hurricane.

The forest is a multiple use area. Recreation opportunities include campsites, rifle ranges, boat ramps, and several trails for hiking, horseback riding, mountain biking, including the Palmetto Trail, as well as off-road motorcycling and atv riding specifically at the Wambaw Cycle Trailhead. (OHV) The Forest Service also administers wilderness areas, experimental forests, timber production, and protection and management of wildlife and the watershed.

Wilderness areas
There are four officially designated wilderness areas lying within Francis Marion National Forest that are part of the National Wilderness Preservation System.
 Hell Hole Bay Wilderness
 Little Wambaw Swamp Wilderness
 Wambaw Creek Wilderness
 Wambaw Swamp Wilderness

Bibliography

Jerman, Patricia (2000). South Carolina Nature Viewing Guide. Charleston: University of South Carolina Press.
(1941). South Carolina: A Guide to the Palmetto State. New York: Oxford University Press.

External links

 

National Forests of South Carolina
Protected areas established in 1936
Protected areas of Berkeley County, South Carolina
Protected areas of Charleston County, South Carolina
Tributaries of the Santee River